"I'd Do Anything" is a song performed by various characters in the 1960 British musical Oliver! and the 1968 film of the same name.

Song
The song is part of Act One of Oliver!, and is sung in Fagin's lair. It begins with spoken dialogue between Nancy and the Artful Dodger, soon leading into the song. Other characters who have lines in the song are Oliver, Fagin and Bet (Nancy's younger sister in the musical; her best friend in the 1968 film and in the original novel), with Fagin's Boys as chorus.

BBC TV series
In 2007, the BBC announced that a new reality television series I'd Do Anything, named after the song, would begin in 2008 to search for a new, unknown lead to play Nancy and three young performers to play Oliver in a West End revival of Oliver!.

Uses in popular culture
The song is featured on the children's television show Skinnamarink TV that aired on The Learning Channel featuring children's entertainers Sharon, Lois & Bram. It is also available on their 1998 record Friends Forever featuring songs from the television series.

In the 1980s, British actor Robert Morley performed this version of the song in television commercials for British Airways serving flights to and from the United Kingdom and other destinations worldwide.

In 1999, American rap artist Jay-Z sampled the chorus of this song in his song "Anything", much like his use of the chorus from Annie's "It's the Hard Knock Life" in his song "Hard Knock Life (Ghetto Anthem)".  This song originally appears as a bonus track on Jay-Z's Vol. 3... Life and Times of S. Carter.

In 2008–2009, the instrumental of I'd Do Anything was used in a HSBC commercial. Latterly, the song was used in a series of anti-smoking public information films, with various groups of children singing the song (different lines for different groups of children). The campaign's message was: "Your kids would do anything for you. Why don't you stop smoking for them?"

In 2014, a cover of the song by Mike Preston was used in a VW ad.

In 2021, the song is used in an ad campaign for PetSmart pet care stores in the United States and Canada.

See also
"As Long as He Needs Me"
"Consider Yourself"
"Food, Glorious Food"
"Oliver!" (song)
"Where Is Love?"
"You've Got to Pick a Pocket or Two"

References

Songs written by Lionel Bart
Songs from Oliver!
1960 songs